God Bullies were an American noise rock band from Kalamazoo, Michigan. They were active from 1986–1995, briefly reunited in the early 2000s and most recently in the summer of 2010 to coincide with the Amphetamine Reptile Records' 25th Anniversary concert. This 2010 tour was known as the "War On Peace" tour and featured core members David B. Livingstone (lead guitar), Mike Hard (vocals), Mike Corso (bass) & Adam Berg (drums). This lineup also featured longtime friend of the band & Mike Hard collaborator (Thrall & The Brain Saw), Johnnie Johnson on additional guitar. Johnson also played bass on select dates in which Corso was unavailable. Performances during this tour were dubbed "Vintage God Bullies". The setlists sprawled across the band's entire catalog and averaged 25–30 songs a night. Yourfleshmag.com's review of God Bullies performance at the AmRep 25th Anniversary Bash said : "There were two or three bands that day who generated plenty of talk and God Bullies were easily one of the three. Well deserved praise for a band that hasn’t really been functioning full-time for a while."

Although God Bullies never found any mainstream success, creepy anthems like "Let's Go To Hell", "Ordinary Man" and "Cemetery", paired with frontman Mike Hard's theatrical delivery and over-the-top stage antics, earned the band a large cult following. God Bullies toured extensively throughout the US and Europe with artists including Hole, Melvins, Helmet, Tar, Surgery, Cows and Helios Creed. The band released material with Alternative Tentacles and Sympathy For The Record Industry, but the bulk of their releases were with Amphetamine Reptile Records.

After the disbandment in 1995, Mike Hard went on to form Thrall. The majority of Thrall's releases were with Alternative Tentacles. Thrall eventually ran its course, and Hard reunited with God Bullies guitarist David Livingstone and drummer Adam Berg to form Th3y N3v3r Sl33p. This project also featured original Thrall bassist "Queen Bee" Karen Neal. Th3y N3v3r Sl33p went on hiatus in early 2011.

Guitarist David B. Livingstone passed away in February 2023.

Discography

References

External links 
 
 

Alternative Tentacles artists
American noise rock music groups
Amphetamine Reptile Records artists
Punk rock groups from Michigan